Dancing on the Ceiling is the third solo studio album by American singer Lionel Richie, released on July 15, 1986. The album was originally to be titled Say You, Say Me, after the Academy Award-winning track of the same name, but it was renamed to a different track's title after Richie rewrote several songs on the album. The album was released to generally positive reviews and it made No. 1 on the US Billboard 200 chart, selling 4 million copies. The album was Richie’s second with session guitarist Carlos Rios. Following this album's release, Richie went on a long hiatus, not releasing an album of entirely new material for another ten years.

Background and recording 
Lionel Richie had risen to prominence as a member of the Commodores during the late 1970s, but after tensions arose in the band, he left in 1982. His first two solo albums, Lionel Richie (1982) and Can't Slow Down (1983), were runaway successes: Lionel Richie sold 4 million copies, while Can't Slow Down sold 10 million copies, and won the Grammy Award for Album of the Year.

Recording of the songs later used on Dancing on the Ceiling began in 1985. The track "Say You, Say Me" was used in that year's film White Nights for which it had won an Academy Award for Best Original Song and a Golden Globe Award for Best Original Song. Work on the album was done while Richie was finalizing his work with "We Are the World".

During early production, the album was intended to be titled Say You, Say Me and released in December 1985. However, Richie found that he did not "want to do those songs" owing to the social conditions he saw, and as such he began rewriting it "to express what [he] felt the world was boxing itself into". Ultimately, the album's title was changed to Dancing on the Ceiling, as the titular song was Richie's next single. Recording for the album took over a year and a half, and Richie later stated that he tried to include a mixture of sounds.

Reception 

Dancing on the Ceiling has generally received positive reviews. Anthony Decurtis, reviewing in Rolling Stone, gave the album a positive review, writing that it "sets an impressive standard for mainstream pop craft", encompassing Richie's "finest qualities". He especially praised the track "Say You, Say Me", but found "Ballerina Girl" a "virtual anthology of Richie's worst saccharine excesses". Los Angeles Times critic Robert Hilburn found that "We Are the World" had left Richie "with a deeper sense of social purpose, and his attempts to infuse that sense into his traditional approach brings a tension to the new album that makes Dancing on the Ceiling his most satisfying collection."

Music critic Robert Christgau of The Village Voice ranked the album a B+. He found that it provided "lulling, almost mantralike entertainment" with "a knack for tune that puts [Richie] over the fine line between lulling and boring". His criticism centered on "Ballerina" for its mawkishness and lack of interest in some of the faster songs. Meanwhile, Stephen Thomas Erlewine of AllMusic retrospectively gave Dancing on the Ceiling four out of five stars, summarizing that, overall, the album was "a solid, enjoyable affair". He considered, however, it a "comedown" after Richie's previous albums, with its songs generally longer than necessary and the lyrics mixing "silliness ... and sappiness".

Chart performance 
Dancing on the Ceiling was released on August 5, 1986. The album sold 4 million copies in the US and it became the first album to be simultaneously certified gold, platinum, double platinum, and triple platinum by the Recording Industry Association of America since the institution established double platinum in 1984. In South Africa initial shipments were 60,000 prerelease units. To promote the album Richie went on an Outrageous 40-city concert tour, entitled "Outrageous". The first concert was in Phoenix, Arizona.

Dancing on the Ceiling peaked at No. 1 on the US Billboard Hot 200. The title track was the second biggest single from the album, reaching No. 2 in the US and No. 7 in the UK Singles Chart, falling behind "Say You, Say Me" earlier performance. Other Top 10 singles from the album include "Love Will Conquer All" (US No. 9, UK No. 45) and "Ballerina Girl" (US No. 7, UK No. 17). Meanwhile, "Deep River Woman" reached No. 10 on Billboard Hot Country Singles chart.

Legacy 
Following the success of Dancing on the Ceiling, Richie withdrew almost entirely from the music industry for six years, a move which Steve Huey of AllMusic suggests was "quitting while he was ahead". He released a compilation album – with some new material – entitled Back to Front in 1992, with his first all-new release, Louder Than Words, following in 1996. , none of his successive albums have been as successful as Lionel Richie, Can't Slow Down, and Dancing on the Ceiling. A remastered edition of Dancing on the Ceiling was released in 2003, featuring four bonus tracks.

Track listing 
All tracks produced by Lionel Richie and James Anthony Carmichael, except "Night Train (Smooth Alligator)," produced by Narada Michael Walden.

Personnel 
Credits lifted from the album's liner notes.

Musicians

 Lionel Richie – lead vocals, rhythm arrangements (1–3, 5–8), vocal arrangements (1–8), choir arrangements (2), arrangements (4), keyboards (6–8), drum machine (6)
 John Barnes – acoustic piano (1), synthesizers (4), Synclavier (4), arrangements (4)
 Michael Boddicker – synthesizers (1–3, 5–9)
 Carlos Rios – synthesizers (1), guitars (1, 2, 7), rhythm arrangements (1), acoustic guitar (8)
 Steve MacMillan – door creek effects (1)
 Ken Caillat – sound effects (1)
 Tom Jones – sound effects (1)
 Greg Phillinganes – keyboards (2, 5, 7, 8), synthesizers (2, 6), drum machine (2, 6), rhythm arrangements (2, 6), Minimoog bass (8)
 Michael Lang – keyboards (3)
 Neil Larsen – keyboards (3)
 Preston Glass – synthesizers (9)
 Cory Lerios – synthesizers (9)
 Tim May – guitars (3, 5, 7, 8)
 Charles Fearing – guitars (4)
 Louis Shelton – guitar solo (5)
 David Cochrane – guitars (6)
 Eric Clapton – guitar solo (7)
 Steve Lukather – guitars (8) 
 Vernon "Ice" Black – guitar solo (9) 
 Neil Stubenhaus – bass guitar (1)
 Nathan East – bass guitar (2, 3, 6)
 Joe Chemay – bass guitar (5, 7)
 Abraham Laboriel – bass guitar (8)
 Randy Jackson – bass guitar (9)
 John Robinson – drums (1, 8)
 Paul Leim – drums (2, 3, 5–7), drum machine (8), additional drums (9)
 Narada Michael Walden – drums (9), drum programming (9), arrangements (9), vocal arrangements (9)
 Paulinho da Costa – percussion (2, 4, 6-9)
 Sheila E. – percussion (4)
 James Anthony Carmichael – horn arrangements (1, 7), rhythm arrangements (1–3, 5–8), string arrangements (3, 5, 8)

Background vocals

 Maxi Anderson (Tracks 1, 2)
 Billie Barnum (Tracks 1, 2) 
 Melinda Chatman (Tracks 1, 2) 
 David Cochrane (Tracks 1, 2) 
 Kevin Dorsey (Tracks 1, 2) 
 Karen Jackson (Tracks 1, 2) 
 Marlena Jeter (Tracks 1, 2) 
 Fred Law (Tracks 1, 2) 
 Janice Marie (Tracks 1, 2) 
 Rick Nelson (Tracks 1, 2) 
 Brenda Richie (Tracks 1, 2) 
 Anita Sherman (Tracks 1, 2) 
 Karen Siegel (Tracks 1, 2) 
 Alfie Silas (Tracks 1, 2) 
 Phyllis St. James (Tracks 1, 2) 
 Stephanie Taylor (Tracks 1, 2)
 Deborah Thomas (Tracks 1, 2, 7) 
 Carmen Twillie (Tracks 1, 2) 
 Julia Waters Tillman (Tracks 1, 2, 7) 
 Maxine Waters Willard (Tracks 1, 2, 7)
 Leslie Smith (Track 2)
 Lionel Richie (Track 4)
 Suzee Ikeda (Track 4)
 Marva King (Tracks 4, 6, 9)
 Alabama (Track 5)
 Richard Marx (Track 7)
 Kitty Beethoven (Track 9)
 Jennifer Hall (Track 9)

Hoopa Hollers on "Dancing on the Ceiling":

 James Anthony Carmichael 
 David Egerton
 Wayne Hargrave 
 Linda Jenner
 Steve MacMillan
 Greg Phillinganes
 Kathi Pogoda
 Cheryl Pyle
 Carlos Rios 
 Maximo Rios 
 Dave Rosen 
 Kelly Ryan
 Wibert Terrell

Production 
 Producers – Lionel Richie (all tracks); James Anthony Carmichael (all tracks); Narada Michael Walden (Track 9).
 Production Assistant – Brenda Harvey-Richie
 Production Direction – Suzee Wendy Ikeda
 Engineers – Calvin Harris (Tracks 1–8); David Frazer and Gordon Lyon (Track 9).
 Additional Recording on Tracks 1-8 – David Egerton and Fred Law
 Assistant Recording on Tracks 1-8– David Egerton 
 Assistant Engineers – Karen Siegel and Mark Smith (all tracks); Dana Jon Chappelle and Stuart Hirotsu (Track 9).
 Dimensional recording by Spherical Sound, Inc. on Track #1.
 Mixed by Calvin Harris
 Mix Assistants – Fred Law and Steve MacMillan 
 Mastered by Brian Gardner at Bernie Grundman Mastering (Hollywood, CA).
 Art Direction – Johnny Lee
 Photography – Aaron Rapoport

Charts

Weekly charts

Year-end charts

Certifications and sales

References

Works cited 

 

 

1986 albums
Lionel Richie albums
Albums produced by Narada Michael Walden
Albums produced by James Anthony Carmichael
Albums produced by Lionel Richie
Motown albums